Clay modeling (or clay model making) for automobile prototypes was first introduced in the 1930s by automobile designer Harley Earl, head of the General Motors styling studio (known initially as the Art and Color Section, and later as the Design and Styling Department).

Industrial plasticine, or "clay", which is used for this purpose, is a malleable material that can be easily shaped, thus enabling designers to create models to visualize a product.  Clay modeling was soon adopted throughout the industry and remains in use today.

External links
 General Motors - Car Design History 

Vehicle design